Tarina Patel is a South African actress, film producer and model, born in Cape Town and raised in Durban. She appeared in Akshay Kumar's, Horror-comedy - Bhool Bhulaiyaa. Patel has appeared on numerous magazine covers including Elle, Dossier, FHM, Glamour and Cosmopolitan. She has been on the South African version of The Real Housewives of Johannesburg but allegedly has been fired for season 3.

Early life

In June 2021, a property she resides in worth an estimated 12 million rand, in Sandton, Johannesburg, was seized by the National Prosecuting Authority, following the arrest of her husband, Iqbal Sharma.

Patel's husband was denied bail and remains in police custody.

Career

Acting and film 
Patel returned to India after competing her degree in psychology and learned Hindi - a prerequisite for an actor in the Bollywood film industry. She made her film debut in 2006 with the film One Night With The King alongside Omar Sharif and Peter O'Toole. She followed with the Bollywood film Just Married, released on March 16, 2007. She had a special appearance in Dhol. She also performed a small role in the movie Bhagam Bhag and in Bhool Bhulaiyaa, which was the year's highest grossing motion picture in India, in which she had the supporting role of Nandini Upadhyay.

Patel has been on the South African version of The Real Housewives of Johannesburg season 2 but allegedly was fired for season 3.

References

External links

Living people
21st-century South African actresses
Actresses from Cape Town
South African female models
South African film producers
South African people of Indian descent
Year of birth missing (living people)